The 1916 Oregon Agricultural Aggies football team represented Oregon Agricultural College (now known as Oregon State University) in the Pacific Coast Conference (PCC) during the 1916 college football season. In their first season under head coach Joseph Pipal, the Aggies compiled a 4–5 record (0–2 against PCC opponents), finished in third place in the PCC, and were outscored by their opponents by a combined total of 112 to 92. The team played its home games at Bell Field in Corvallis, Oregon. Brewer Billie was the team captain.

Schedule

References

Oregon Agricultural
Oregon State Beavers football seasons
Oregon Agricultural Aggies football